James Alex Trane (April 29, 1857 – January 24, 1936) was a Norwegian-American inventor and industrialist. He was the co-founder of Trane.

Biography
James Alex Trane was born in Tromsø, Norway. He was an immigrant to the United States who settled in La Crosse, Wisconsin in 1864, finding work as a steamfitter and plumber. In 1885, he opened his own plumbing shop.

Besides being a steamfitter and a plumber, James Trane was also an inventor. He designed a new type of low-pressure steam heating system, Trane vapor heating. Reuben Trane, James' son, earned a Mechanical Engineering degree (B.S. 1910) at the University of Wisconsin–Madison and joined his father's plumbing firm.

In 1913, James and Reuben incorporated The Trane Company. By 1916, the Tranes were no longer in the plumbing business, but rather were focusing their attention on manufacturing heating products.

In 1925, Reuben Trane invented a new type of heat transfer device known as the convector radiator.  It consisted of a new style of heat exchanger in a sheet metal cabinet—a highly efficient, lightweight replacement for the bulky, slow-responding castiron radiator. In 1931, The Trane Company developed its first air conditioning unit, the Trane unit cooler, and in 1938 its first centrifugal refrigeration machine, the Turbovac.

References

External links
Trane official website

1857 births
1936 deaths
People from Tromsø
People from La Crosse, Wisconsin
Norwegian emigrants to the United States
19th-century American inventors
20th-century American inventors
American industrialists
American company founders
American business executives
Ingersoll Rand people